Mārtiņš Dzierkals (born 4 April 1997) is a Latvian professional ice hockey forward who plays for HC Škoda Plzeň in the Czech Extraliga (ELH).

Playing career
In the 2015 NHL Entry Draft, he was selected 68th overall by the Toronto Maple Leafs. After two seasons with the Rouyn-Noranda Huskies in the Quebec Major Junior Hockey League, he spent much of the 2017–18 season with the Orlando Solar Bears in the ECHL, before returning to Latvia to play for the Dinamo Riga of the Kontinental Hockey League (KHL).

On trade deadline day of the 2019–20 NHL season, on 25 February 2020, the Maple Leafs traded Dzierkals rights away in a three-team trade to the Vegas Golden Knights via the Chicago Blackhawks, and gained a 5th-round pick in the 2020 NHL Entry Draft.

After spending the 2019–20 season with Jukurit in the Finnish Liiga, posting 7 goals and 15 points in 39 games, Dzierkals opted to return to his native Latvia by agreeing to a second tenure with Dinamo Riga with a one-year contract on 28 July 2020.

International play
He represented Latvia at the 2017 World Junior Ice Hockey Championships and the 2019 IIHF World Championship.

Career statistics

Regular season and playoffs

International

References

External links

1997 births
Living people
Dinamo Riga players
Latvian expatriate ice hockey people
Latvian expatriate sportspeople in Canada
Latvian expatriate sportspeople in the United States
Latvian ice hockey forwards
Mikkelin Jukurit players
Orlando Solar Bears (ECHL) players
HC Plzeň players
Rouyn-Noranda Huskies players
Ice hockey people from Riga
Toronto Marlies players
Toronto Maple Leafs draft picks
Ice hockey players at the 2022 Winter Olympics
Olympic ice hockey players of Latvia
Latvian expatriate sportspeople in the Czech Republic
Latvian expatriate sportspeople in Finland
Expatriate ice hockey players in the United States
Expatriate ice hockey players in Canada
Expatriate ice hockey players in the Czech Republic
Expatriate ice hockey players in Finland
Motor České Budějovice players
HK Riga players